Gustav Heinrich Otth (2 June 1806, Bern – 8 November 1874) was a Swiss mycologist and military officer. He was the brother of naturalist Carl Adolf Otth (1803-1839).

Known for his taxonomic research, Otth described Pucciniastrum, a genus of rust fungi within the family Pucciniastraceae. He was the binomial author of a number of species within the genus Peronospora.

The fungi genus Otthia (Nitschke ex Fuckel) was named in his honour in 1870.

Associated publications 
 "Ueber die Brand- und Rostpilze: vorgetragen den 23. Februar und 9. März 1861", (1861).
 "Gustav Otth ein bernischer Pilzforscher, 1806-1874", (1908, with E. Fischer).

References 

1806 births
1874 deaths
People from Bern
Swiss mycologists